Werner Hausmann (31 October 1923 – 29 November 2001) was a Swiss field hockey player. He competed in the men's tournament at the 1960 Summer Olympics.

References

External links
 

1923 births
2001 deaths
Swiss male field hockey players
Olympic field hockey players of Switzerland
Field hockey players at the 1960 Summer Olympics
Sportspeople from the canton of Solothurn